Charles Carpenter may refer to:
 Charles Carpenter (bishop) (1899–1969), 6th Episcopal Bishop of Alabama
 Charles Carpenter (cricketer) (1837–1876), English cricketer
 Charles Carpenter (lieutenant colonel) (1913–1966), also known as "Bazooka Charlie", United States Army L-4 aircraft pilot
 Charles Carpenter (medical researcher), helped found the David Geffen School of Medicine at UCLA
 Charles Carpenter (musician), prolific songwriter active in the 1930s and 1940s (see "You Taught Me to Love Again")
 Charles Carpenter (Royal Navy officer), MP for Berwick-upon-Tweed, 1790–1796
 Charles C. Carpenter (settler), organized and instigated the first unauthorized attempt to homestead the Unassigned Lands in Oklahoma Territory in 1879
 Charles C. Carpenter (admiral) (1834–1899), United States Navy rear admiral
 Charles Congden Carpenter (1921–2016), naturalist and herpetologist
 Charles E. Carpenter (1845–1923), co-founder of Stone, Carpenter & Willson
 Charles F. Carpenter, President of the U.S. Tri-State League in baseball, 1906–1913
 Charles H. Carpenter, first photographer for the Field Museum, Chicago, 1899–1947
 Charles H. Carpenter, one of the Guantanamo Bay attorneys
 Charles I. Carpenter (1906–1994), first Chief of Chaplains of the United States Air Force
 Charles L. Carpenter (1902–1992), U.S. Navy admiral
 Charles K. Carpenter (1872–1948), American minister in northern Illinois state
 Charles T. Carpenter (1858–1945), banker taken hostage by the Dalton Gang
 Charles U. Carpenter (1872–1928), American business manager and management author
 Charles William Carpenter (1886–1971), Baptist minister and Civil Rights activist
 Charles Carpenter (American football) (1898–1960), American football player
 Charles Sydney Carpenter, nicknamed Bubba Carpenter (born 1968), Major League Baseball player
Charles Carpenter, character in Another Life, Christian soap opera

See also
 List of people with surname Carpenter#C